Uncial 0132 (in the Gregory-Aland numbering), ε 82 (Soden), is a Greek uncial manuscript of the New Testament, dated palaeographically to the 9th century. Formerly it was labelled by Wf.

Description 

The codex contains a small part of the Mark 5:16-40, on only one parchment leaf (25 cm by 17 cm). The text is written in two columns per page, 33 lines per page, in 14-18 letters per line. The uncial letters are large. It contains breathing and accents. 
The leaf has survived in a fragmentary condition.

It is a palimpsest, the upper text was written in the 11th century, it belongs to the Minuscule 639. 

It has doxology in the Lord's Prayer.

Text 

It contains text: Mark 5:16 το δε αυτοις οι—θαλασσ[αν] 5:21. 22 ονοματι—αψωμαι [ς]ωθη 28.29 και εγνω—λαλουντος 35.35 σου απεθανεν—το παιδιον 40. According to Gregory its text is not good.

The Greek text of this codex is mixed, with a strong element of the Byzantine text-type. Aland placed it in Category III.

History 

It is dated by the INTF to the 9th century.

The manuscript was discovered by A. A. Vansittart. 
It was described by Kitchin, Tischendorf, and C. R. Gregory.

The codex is located now at the Christ Church College (Wake 37, f. 237) in Oxford.

See also 

 List of New Testament uncials
 Textual criticism

References

Further reading 

 J. H. Greenlee, Nine Uncial Palimpsests of the New Testament, S & D XXXIX (Salt Lake City, 1968). 
 Hermann von Soden, Die Schriften des Neuen Testaments, in ihrer ältesten erreichbaren Textgestalt hergestellt auf Grund ihrer Textgeschichte, Verlag von Arthur Glaue, Berlin 1902, p. 79. 

Greek New Testament uncials
Palimpsests
9th-century biblical manuscripts